Artemio Motta (c. 1661 - 18th century) was an Italian composer of the Baroque period.

Artemio Motta was a Catholic priest, born in Parma into a wealthy family. His musical output consists of 10 Concerti a cinque, Op.1 (published Modena: Fortuniano Rosati, 1701 and again Amsterdam: Estienne Roger, 1702) and a collection of Cantatas ''Cantate a voce sola'', Op.2, (published Bologna: Marino Silvani, 1704). There are also a small number of works which survive in manuscript form. Motta's Concerti conform stylistically to those of Giuseppe Torelli. They are typical for the time in that they contain two parts for the viola.

Discography 
 10 Concerti à 5 performed by Ars Antiqua Austria directed by Gunar Letzbor, 2010 Challenge Classics CC 72336

This recording was published as works of Sigr. Mouthon (presumably the French lutenist Charles Mouthon), whose name was found on a handwritten copy of the work which was used as the basis for the recording.

References

External links 
 
 A. Motta, "Concerto in A minor Op. 1/6", Ars Antiqua Austria.

1660s births
18th-century deaths
Year of birth uncertain
Year of death unknown
18th-century Italian composers
Italian Baroque composers